Achthophora humeralis is a species of beetle in the family Cerambycidae. It was described by Heller in 1916, originally as the type species of the genus Dissomatus. It is known from the Philippines.

References

Lamiini
Beetles described in 1916